The Joint Committee on Consolidation Bills (commonly known as Consolidation Bills Committee) is a joint committee of the Parliament of the United Kingdom. The Committee was first established in 1894 with a remit to consider consolidation bills. The Committee, which also considers Statute Law Revision Bills and bills prepared by the Law Commission or Scottish Law Commission to repeal outdated laws, is made up of 12 members of each House. Bills considered by the Committee originate in the Lords and are referred to it after second reading. After the Committee reports, the remaining stages in both Houses proceed formally (i.e., without debate).

Membership
As of May 2022, the members of the committee are as follows:

See also 
 Joint Committee of the Parliament of the United Kingdom
 Parliamentary Committees of the United Kingdom

References

External links 
Joint Select Committee on Consolidation Bills, UK Parliament

Conso
Select Committees of the British House of Commons
1894 establishments in the United Kingdom